Phytocoris longipennis is a species of plant bugs belonging to the family Miridae and subfamily Mirinae.

Description
The species have black coloured pronotum with brownish or black upperside.

Distribution
It is found in most parts of Europe.<ref>{{cite web|url= http://www.faunaeur.org/full_results.php?id=452046|archive-url= https://web.archive.org/web/20131014173020/http://www.faunaeur.org/full_results.php?id=452046|url-status= dead|archive-date= October 14, 2013|title=Phytocoris (Phytocoris) longipennis Flor, 1861|publisher=Fauna Europaea|version=2.6.2|date=August 29, 2013|accessdate=October 13, 2013}}</ref> and then East across the Palearctic to Central Asia

EcologyPhytocoris longipennis'' is found on deciduous trees where it feeds on mites and other small insects. Flight time is from June to October.

References

External links
Phytocoris longipennis images at  Consortium for the Barcode of Life
Phytocoris tiliae

Insects described in 1861
Hemiptera of Europe
Miridae